James Webbe (by 1528 – 1557), of Devizes, Wiltshire, was an English politician.

He was a Member (MP) of the Parliament of England for Devizes in 1555.

References

People from Devizes
English MPs 1555
Year of birth uncertain
1557 deaths